Demissa is a genus of snails, gastropod mollusks in the family Marginellidae, the margin snails.

Species
 Demissa alisonae Boyer, 2016
 Demissa angelozzii Cossignani & Lorenz, 2018
 Demissa benthedii Boyer, 2016
 Demissa borbonica Boyer, 2016
 Demissa carolinensis Boyer, 2016
 Demissa cecalupoi (Cossignani, 2005)
 Demissa deformis (G. Nevill & H. Nevill, 1874)
 Demissa fusulina Boyer, 2016
 Demissa lorenzi Boyer, 2016
 Demissa maccleeryi Boyer, 2016
 Demissa maldiviensis Boyer, 2016
 Demissa masirana Boyer, 2016
 Demissa meridionalis Boyer, 2016
 Demissa nevilli (Jousseaume, 1875)
 Demissa philippinarum Boyer, 2016
 Demissa poppei Boyer, 2016
 Demissa procrita (Kilburn, 1977)
 Demissa pupa Boyer, 2018
 Demissa santoensis Boyer, 2016
 Demissa volunta (Laseron, 1957)
 Demissa zanzibarica Boyer, 2016

References

 Jousseaume, F., 1875. Coquilles de la famille des marginelles, Monographie. Revue et Magasin de Zoologie Pure et Appliquée 3(3): 164-278; 429-435
 Fischer-Piette, E. & Beigbeder, J., 1944. Catalogue des types de gastéropodes marins conservés au laboratoire de Malacologie. VI. Mitridae, Marginellidae, Olividae, Columbellidae et Conidae. Bulletin du Muséum national d'Histoire naturelle 16(1): 448-462, sér. 2° série
 Boyer F. (2016). Etude d'un nouveau genre de Marginellidae (Mollusca : Neogastropoda) de l'Indo-Pacifique. Xenophora Taxonomy. 10: 31-48

External links

Marginellidae